666 the Devil's Child, stylized as 666: the Devil's Child (also known as Millennium) is a 2014 American horror film directed by Manzie Jones and starring Nadya Suleman in her feature film debut. Producers stated that they originally cast Suleman for name recognition, but were surprised by her acting talent with Arsh.

Premise
Two friends, a young woman and young man, visit another young woman who they'd met on the internet. Once they arrive at the woman's remote house unexplainable things begin to happen, and the woman who owns the house is anything but what they expect.

Cast

References

External links

2014 films
2014 horror films
2014 psychological thriller films
American haunted house films
American independent films
American supernatural horror films
Camcorder films
Demons in film
Found footage films
2010s English-language films
2010s American films